Walter D. Cavers was a member of the Wisconsin State Assembly.

Biography
Cavers was born on October 31, 1888, in Allamakee County, Iowa. Later, he moved to Antigo, Wisconsin. He was in the real estate and insurance business. He died on December 6, 1955, from a heart attack.

Career
Cavers was elected to the Assembly in 1950. Additionally, he was President of White Lake, Wisconsin and a member of the White Lake Board of Education and the Langlade County, Wisconsin Board. He was a Republican.

References

People from Allamakee County, Iowa
People from Antigo, Wisconsin
Businesspeople from Wisconsin
Republican Party members of the Wisconsin State Assembly
Mayors of places in Wisconsin
County supervisors in Wisconsin
School board members in Wisconsin
1888 births
1955 deaths
20th-century American politicians
People from Langlade County, Wisconsin
20th-century American businesspeople